Udo Riglewski and Michael Stich were the defending champions of the doubles event at the CA-TennisTrophy tennis tournament but lost in the semifinals to Jakob Hlasek and Patrick McEnroe.

Anders Järryd and Gary Muller won in the final 6–4, 7–5 against Hlasek and McEnroe.

Seeds

  Jakob Hlasek /  Patrick McEnroe (final)
  Anders Järryd /  Gary Muller (champions)
  Udo Riglewski /  Michael Stich (semifinals)
  Javier Frana /  Leonardo Lavalle (first round)

Draw

External links
 1991 CA-TennisTrophy Doubles draw

Doubles